Gustav Adolf Fingal Wiklund (26 June 1934 – 27 August 2019) was a Finnish actor. He has appeared both in theatrical and film roles, in Swedish and Finnish language. He was born in Helsinki. He worked at the Lilla Teatern in Helsinki in 1960–1979 and at the Svenska Teatern in 1979–1990, especially noted for his roles in musical revues. He also presented his paintings at exhibitions.

Partial filmography

Tie pimeään (1962) - Radio Shop Salesman
Takiaispallo (1970) - Insurance inspector Erik Kaartinen
Haluan rakastaa, Peter (1972) - Anders Jansson
Hemåt i natten (1977) - Kurt Yläranta
Aika hyvä ihmiseksi (1977) - Poliisimestari
Män kan inte våldtas (1978) - Janitor
Poet and Muse (1978) - Doctor
Slumrande toner (1978)
Risto Vanarin piilokamera (1979) - Brawling man
Natalia (1979) - Conductor
Mördare! Mördare! (1980, TV Movie) - Polis
Barna från Blåsjöfjället (1980) - Scout
Operation Leo (1981) - Taxichaufför
Kuningas jolla ei ollut sydäntä (1982) - Lääkäri
Sista Leken (1984) - Läkare
Nattseilere (1986) - Priest
Petos (1988) - Conductor
Drakarna över Helsingfors (2001) - Avdelningschef
Aleksis Kiven elämä (2001) - J.V. Snellman
Raid (2003) - Heinrichs
Populärmusik från Vittula (Popular Music From Vittula, 2004) - Ryssi-Jussi
Äideistä parhain (2005) - Pappi
Tali-Ihantala 1944 (2007) - (voice)
Där vi en gång gått (2011) - Wrede

References

External links

1934 births
2019 deaths
Male actors from Helsinki